Intlo Srimathi Veedhilo Kumari is a 2004 Telugu-language comedy film directed by K. Vasu. It stars Srikanth, Prabhu Deva and Aarti Chhabria. A remake of Priyadarshan's 2003 Hindi film Hungama, which itself borrowed its story from the director's Poochakkoru Mookkuthi (1984), Intlo Srimathi Veedhilo Kumari opened to mixed reviews in August 2004.

Cast

Srikanth as Sukumar
Prabhu Deva as Gopal
Aarti Chhabria as Anjali
Prakash Raj as Sundara Murthy
Urvashi as Anjali
Chandra Mohan
Brahmanandam
Kavitha
Tanikella Bharani
M. S. Narayana
Ali
Venu Madhav
Dharmavarapu Subramanyam
Gundu Hanumantha Rao
Babloo
Shilpa Chakravarti

Soundtrack

Release
Jeevi of Idlebrain.com gave the film a mixed review, citing "the first half is average and second half is a letdown" and "the main drawback of the film is the mistiming of comedy". He added "comedy films do not work out when the comedy timing in those films goes amiss". Another critic from MyMazaa.com stated "on the evidence of this film, the director lacks the skill to handle such subjects with finesse" and added "there is a thin line dividing comedy and confusion and that he lets the film slip into the latter stream".

The film did not perform well at the box office, and post-release, Srikanth stated he did the film for "emotional reasons" and signed the film on the belief that Allu Aravind had a good stature in the industry.

References

2004 films
2000s Telugu-language films
Telugu remakes of Malayalam films
Films directed by K. Vasu